The 1981 UMass Minutemen football team represented the University of Massachusetts Amherst in the 1981 NCAA Division I-AA football season as a member of the Yankee Conference. The team was coached by Bob Pickett and played its home games at Alumni Stadium in Hadley, Massachusetts. The 1981 season saw the Minutemen win their thirteenth Yankee Conference title. UMass finished the season with a record of 6–3 overall and 4–1 in conference play.

Schedule

References

UMass
UMass Minutemen football seasons
Yankee Conference football champion seasons
UMass Minutemen football